Joachim IV (5 July 1837 – 15 February 1887) was Ecumenical Patriarch of Constantinople from 1884 to 1886.

See also
 List of Ecumenical Patriarchs of Constantinople

1837 births
1887 deaths
Clergy from Chios
Bishops of Larissa
19th-century Ecumenical Patriarchs of Constantinople